Henry Ashley (1778–1829) was an American politician.

Henry Ashley may also refer to:

Henry Ashley (MP for Dorset) (1519–1588), MP for Shaftesbury and Dorset
Henry Ashley (MP, born 1548), MP for Wareham, Poole and Christchurch
Henry Ashley (Dorchester MP) (1807–1858), English politician and cricketer